Sherwin Anatacio de la Paz is a retired Filipino water polo player and current head coach of the Philippines women's national water polo team. He was a member of the Philippines men's national water polo team from 2003 to 2011. He is a four-time Southeast Asian Games silver medalist (2005, 2007, 2009 and 2011). He later coached the women's team to a bronze medal at the 2019 Southeast Asian Games.

References

Living people
Year of birth missing (living people)
Filipino male water polo players
Filipino water polo coaches
Southeast Asian Games silver medalists for the Philippines